This is a list of African-American newspapers that have been published in the state of Montana.  

Montana's first such newspaper was The Colored Citizen, published in Helena in the fall of 1894.  During this period of the late 19th and early 20th centuries, the African-American population of Montana fluctuated between 1000 and 1500 people.

Montana has the unique position of being entirely surrounded by states (Idaho, Wyoming, North Dakota and South Dakota) that have never had an African-American newspaper. The state's early Black press accordingly covered a particularly wide geographic sweep, and many of Montana's early African American papers carried news from communities in other Western states. Some other states' newspapers returned the favor: the Seattle Northwest Enterprise ran a column of Montana news from the 1920s to 1960s.

Newspapers

See also 
List of African-American newspapers and media outlets
List of newspapers in Montana

Works cited

References

External links 
Montana Historical Society resource page

Newspapers
Montana
African-American
African-American newspapers